Wendy Ward (born May 6, 1973) is an American professional golfer who played on the LPGA Tour.

Early life, education and amateur career
Ward was born in San Antonio, Texas.

She attended Arizona State University where she had a successful National Collegiate Athletic Association (NCAA) career. She was a two-time Honda Sports Award winner, a three-time first team All-American, the Pac-10 Champion in 1993 and 1995 and led ASU to team titles in 1993, 1994 and 1995. She graduated in 1995 with a degree in business Management.

In 1994, she won the U.S. Women's Amateur and represented the U.S. in the Curtis Cup, the biennial team competition between amateur golfers from the United States and those from Great Britain and Ireland.

Professional career
Ward turned professional in 1995 and qualified for the LPGA Tour on her first attempt to become a rookie in 1996. Her first win came at the 1997 Fieldcrest Cannon Classic where she set both the all-time 54 and 72-hole LPGA scoring records; both records have since been broken.

She won four tournaments on the tour. Her best season was 2001, when she finished 12th on the official LPGA Tour money list.

Ward was a member of the 2002, 2003 and 2005 U.S. Solheim Cup teams. She was also selected as an assistant captain to Juli Inkster for the 2015 Solheim Cup team.

Personal life
Ward lives on a  cattle ranch in Edwall, Washington where she operates a cow/calf beef operation with her husband, Nate Hair.

Professional wins (4)

LPGA Tour wins (4)

LPGA Tour playoff record (1–2)

Results in LPGA majors

^ The Women's British Open replaced the du Maurier Classic as an LPGA major in 2001.
^^ The Evian Championship was added as a major in 2013.

CUT = missed the half-way cut
WD = withdrew
"T" = tied

Summary
Starts – 62
Wins – 0
2nd-place finishes – 0
3rd-place finishes – 2
Top 3 finishes – 2
Top 5 finishes – 3
Top 10 finishes – 4
Top 25 finishes – 14
Missed cuts – 22
Most consecutive cuts made – 8
Longest streak of top-10s – 1

U.S. national team appearances
Amateur
Curtis Cup: 1994 (tie)
Espirito Santo Trophy: 1994 (winners)

Professional
Solheim Cup: 2002 (winners), 2003, 2005 (winners)

Solheim Cup record

References

External links

American female golfers
Arizona State Sun Devils women's golfers
LPGA Tour golfers
Winners of ladies' major amateur golf championships
Solheim Cup competitors for the United States
Golfers from San Antonio
Golfers from Washington (state)
People from Lincoln County, Washington
1973 births
Living people